Tailspin Tommy is a 12-episode 1934 Universal film serial based on the Tailspin Tommy comic strip by Hal Forrest.  Directed by Lew Landers and produced by Milton Gatzert, the serial was the 97th serial of the 137 released by that studio (and the 24th with sound). The plot of Tailspin Tommy concerns a conflict over a government airmail contract.

Plot
Two cargo airlines clash over a government mail contract. "Tailspin" Tommy (Maurice Murphy), a young mechanic, gets a job with Three Points Airlines, which wins the contract. Their opponents resort to sabotage in order to have the contract for themselves. Wade "Tiger" Taggart (John Davidson) becomes their enemy, a man who will do anything to stop the airline from doing business.

After Tommy becomes a pilot, he prevents a runaway aircraft from crashing into a crowd of children, among other adventures that put him into the public eye. Eventually Taggert and his gang are brought to justice. Tommy goes on to win a movie contract, and win the heart of his sweetheart Betty Lou Barnes (Patricia Farr).

Cast

 Maurice Murphy as "Tailspin" Tommy Tompkins
 Noah Beery, Jr. as Peter "Skeeter" Milligan
 Patricia Farr as Betty Lou Barnes
 Walter Miller as Bruce Hoyt
 Grant Withers as Milt Howe
 Charles A. Browne as Paul Smith
 Bryant Washburn as Mr Grant, director of Midnight Patrol
 Belle Daube as Mrs Martha Tompkins, Tommy's mother
 John Davidson as Wade "Tiger" Taggart
 Harrison Greene as the Air circus announcer
 William Desmond as Sloane, Taggart's office henchman
 Lew Kelly as Victor Martin, Three Point airport dispatcher
 John Ince as Eric Peabody, one of Taggart's henchmen
 Lee Beggs as Deacon Grimes
 Ethan Laidlaw as Bart Dirk, one of Taggart's henchmen

Chapter titles

 Death Flies the Mail
 The Mail Goes Through
 Sky bandits
 The Copper Room
 The Night Flight
 The Baited Trap
 Tommy to the Rescue
 The Thrill of Death
 The Earth God's Roar
 Death at the Controls
 Rushing Waters
 Littleville's Big DaySource:

Production
Tailspin Tommy was the first serial to be based on a comic strip.  From 1936 to 1945, Universal almost made more serial adaptations of comic strips than both of their rivals, Columbia and Republic, combined.  Jimmy Allen was a rival radio serial character to the Tailspin Tommy newspaper strip.  He featured in the film The Sky Parade.  Grant Withers played the sidekick in this film as well as both Tailspin Tommy serials.

The aircraft used in Tailspin Tommy included:
 Stearman C2B, c/n n110, NC4099 
 Travel Air B 4000, c/n 1337, NC406N and c / n 1323, NC688K 
 Great Lakes 2T1 A, c/n 243, NC11326 
 Fleet 7 
 Douglas M2 
 Curtiss Fledgling, c/n 69, N465K 
 Waco ATO, c/n A-122, NC925H 
 Travel Air R Mystery Plane 
 American Eagle A-101
 Alexander Eaglerock A2, c / n 207, NC1412 
 Fokker Super Universal 
 Boeing P-12 (archive footage)

Stunts
 George DeNormand
 George Magrill

Reception
William C. Cline wrote In the Nick of Tome that Tailspin Tommy was a success, partly due to name recognition. The serial was faithful to its roots and while "other serials were based on comic heroes that have long been forgotten, Hal Forrest's 'Tailspin Tommy' strip ran from 1928 to 1942. Dashing aviator Tommy, his sidekick Skeeter and his girlfriend Betty Lou Barnes ran Three Point Airlines, named after the perfect landing technique. Universal invested heavily in the franchise. Maurice Murphy played Tommy for 1934's Tailspin Tommy serial, and four 1939 feature films starred John Trent as the intrepid airman."

References

Notes

Citations

Bibliography

  Cline, William C. "2. In Search of Ammunition"; "Filmography". In the Nick of Time. Jefferson, North Carolina: McFarland & Company, Inc., 1984. .
 Harmon, Jim and Donald F. Glut. "7. The Aviators "Land That Plane at Once, You Crazy Fool"". The Great Movie Serials: Their Sound and Fury. London: Routledge, 1973. .
 Stedman, Raymond William. "3. At This Theater Next Week". Serials: Suspense and Drama By Installment. University of Oklahoma Press, 1971. .
 Weiss, Ken and Ed Goodgold. To be Continued ...: A Complete Guide to Motion Picture Serials. New York: Bonanza Books, 1973. .

External links
 
 
 

1934 films
1934 adventure films
American aviation films
American black-and-white films
1930s English-language films
Films based on comic strips
Films directed by Lew Landers
Universal Pictures film serials
American adventure films
Films with screenplays by George H. Plympton
1930s American films